Nauclea gageana is a species of large tree in the family Rubiaceae. It is endemic to the Middle and South Andaman Islands of India where it was collected in the 19th century. It has not been recorded since.

References

gageana
Flora of the Andaman Islands
Critically endangered plants
Taxonomy articles created by Polbot